End of the Sweet Parade is the first album by Washington, D.C.-based indie folk pop band Stamen & Pistils. It was released on August 9, 2005 through Echelon Productions.

Track listing
"Hand Painted Characters"
"Somewhere In Between the Beginning and the Middle"
"Peonies & Dahlia Petals"
"Penny Farthing Fair"
"Boys Vs. Girls"
"She the Widow, the Child Who Follows"
"Sleep for the Bells"
"Friction (pts 1 & 2)"

References

External links 
Official site
Label Website
band page on mySpace

2005 albums